The Battle of Cao Bằng was an ongoing campaign in northern Indochina during the First Indochina War, between the French Far East Expeditionary Corps and the Việt Minh, which began in October 1947 and culminated on September 3, 1949. Since the start of the conflict, Việt Minh troops had ambushed French convoys along the Vietnam–China border from the Gulf of Tonkin on a 147-mile route to a French garrison at Cao Bằng, known as Route Colonial 4, or RC4. Repeated ambushes led to repeated French operations of increasing strength to reopen the road, including a costly mission by the Foreign Legion in February 1948. On July 25, 1948, the Cao Bằng encampment was itself attacked and held out for three days with two companies defending against two battalions of Việt Minh. A further 28 ambushes took place in 1948.

In February 1949, five Việt Minh battalions and mortar units took a French post at Lào Cai, and resumed ambushes through the monsoon season. On September 3, 1949, 100 vehicles left That Khe in a reinforced convoy which travelled a distance of  through infantry screens. The French, reduced to one soldier per vehicle due to troop numbers, were ambushed by automatic fire. The first twenty trucks were halted, as were the final ten, and the middle of the convoy was cut down by shellfire. The following day, French troops reoccupied the surrounded hilltops, however only four French wounded were found alive.

The campaign at Cao Bằng resulted in a change in convoy practices for the remainder of the war. Vehicles thereafter travelled from post to post in 10-12 vehicle convoys, through security screens of French troops and with aircraft observation. Through 1950, supply convoys to Cao Bằng were discontinued in favour of air supply.

References

Bibliography
 
 
 
 
 

Conflicts in 1947
Conflicts in 1948
Conflicts in 1949
1947 in Vietnam
1948 in Vietnam
1949 in Vietnam
Battles involving Vietnam
Battles involving France
Battles and operations of the First Indochina War
Vietnamese independence movement
1947 in French Indochina
1948 in French Indochina
1949 in French Indochina
History of Cao Bằng Province
History of Lào Cai Province